The 1907 Kentucky State College Blue and White football team represented Kentucky State College—now known as the University of Kentucky—during the 1907 college football season. The team was state champion; champion of the Kentucky Intercollegiate Athletic Association.

Schedule

References

Kentucky State College
Kentucky Wildcats football seasons
Kentucky State College Blue and White football